The 2023 Superbike World Championship is the 36th season of the Superbike World Championship. Álvaro Bautista will come into the season as the defending world champion.

Race calendar

The provisional 2023 season calendar was announced on 8 November 2022. It was then updated on 28 February 2023 to announce the seventh round at Imola Circuit on 14–16 July.

Entry list

Rider changes 
 Remy Gardner and Dominique Aegerter will race for GYTR GRT Yamaha WorldSBK Team, replacing Kohta Nozane and Garrett Gerloff. Gardner has raced in the MotoGP World Championship in 2022.
 Tom Sykes will return to the Superbike World Championship, joining Kawasaki Puccetti Racing. Sykes has raced in the British Superbike Championship in 2022.
 Danilo Petrucci will make his full-time debut with Barni Spark Racing Team.
 Garrett Gerloff will move to Bonovo Action BMW from GYTR GRT Yamaha WorldSBK Team, replacing Eugene Laverty.
 Isaac Viñales joined Team Pedercini, now in a partnership with Viñales Racing. They will miss the first two races because of sponsorship issues.

Championship standings
Points were awarded as follows:
Race 1 and Race 2

Superpole Race

Riders' championship

Teams' championship

Manufacturers' championship

References

External links 
 

Superbike
Superbike
Superbike
Superbike World Championship seasons